"What a Good Boy" is a song from the Barenaked Ladies' 1992 debut album, Gordon. A live version of the song appeared on the 1994 single for "Jane". Another live version was later released on the live album Rock Spectacle. This version later appears on the compilation Disc One: All Their Greatest Hits. It was also included in the album Upfront! Canadians Live from Mountain Stage. The song was co-written by Steven Page and Ed Robertson.

The song is played during the end credits of the 1995 film, Stonewall, and during the "Hate Crimes" episode of Homicide: Life on the Street.

Personnel
 Steven Page – lead vocals, acoustic guitar
 Ed Robertson – acoustic guitar, background vocals
 Jim Creeggan – double bass
 Andy Creeggan – organ, piano
 Tyler Stewart – drums

Charts

1992 singles
Barenaked Ladies songs
1992 songs
Reprise Records singles
Songs written by Steven Page
Songs written by Ed Robertson